John Shove "Bud" Palmer (born John Palmer Flynn; September 14, 1921 – March 19, 2013) was an American professional basketball player. He was a member of the New York Knicks during the team's first three seasons in the Basketball Association of America, and was the leading scorer in the team's inaugural 1946–47 season. Palmer is considered to be one of the inventors of the 

Born in Hollywood, California, Palmer was the son of football player and actor Maurice Bennett "Lefty" Flynn and singer Blanche Palmer. He was nicknamed "Bud" due to being the budding image of his father; Palmer relinquished his father's surname from his own name when his parents divorced. Palmer was  when he started playing basketball at Hun School of Princeton, and started using the jump shot to compensate for his height.

After his NBA career ended, Palmer went on to have a successful career as a sportscaster. He was Chief of Protocol and Official Greeter for the City of New York for seven years during John Lindsay's administration. Palmer modeled menswear, advertised Vitalis hair tonic, and wrote as an advice columnist in Glamour magazine.

Palmer died at 91 of metastatic prostate cancer in 2013 in West Palm Beach, Florida.

BAA career statistics

Regular season

Playoffs

References

External links

1921 births
2013 deaths
American men's basketball players
American sports announcers
Baseball announcers
Basketball players from Los Angeles
Bowling broadcasters
Centers (basketball)
Forwards (basketball)
Golf writers and broadcasters
Greeters
Motorsport announcers
National Football League announcers
National Hockey League broadcasters
New York Giants announcers
New York Knicks announcers
New York Knicks players
New York Rangers announcers
New York Yankees announcers
Olympic Games broadcasters
Phillips Exeter Academy alumni
Princeton Tigers men's basketball players
Princeton Tigers men's lacrosse players
Princeton Tigers men's soccer players
Tennis commentators
United States Navy personnel of World War II
Deaths from prostate cancer
Deaths from cancer in Florida
Association footballers not categorized by position
Association football players not categorized by nationality